Silvia Silombra  is a 1913 Dutch silent drama film directed by Louis H. Chrispijn.

Cast
Julia Cuypers	... 	Volwassen Silvia / grown-up Silvia
Willem van der Veer		
Charles Gilhuys		
Louis H. Chrispijn		
Caroline van Dommelen		
Enny de Leeuwe	... 	Kind Silvia / child Silvia
Jan van Dommelen	... 	Silvia's vader / priester / Silvia's father / priest
Mary Beekman	
Jan Holtrop		
Christine van Meeteren

External links 
 

1913 films
Dutch silent short films
Dutch black-and-white films
1913 drama films
Films directed by Louis H. Chrispijn
Dutch drama films
Silent drama films